The following is a list of episodes of the PriPara anime television series.

The first opening and ending themes are "Make it!" by Iris and "Jumpin' Dancin'" by Prizmmy. Idol Strength Lesson GO! is later replaced by the fifth ending theme "Heart-Clenching Love Song" (胸キュンLove Song) by Super Girls. The sixth opening and seventh ending themes are "Goin'on" by Iris and "LOVE TROOPER" by Prizmmy. The seventh opening and eighth ending themes are "Ready Smile!" by Iris and "PriPara☆Dancing!!!" by Laala Manaka (Himika Akenaya) and Gaaruru (Asami Sanada). "Ready Smile!" is later replaced by the eighth opening theme "Brand New Dreamer" by Laala Manaka (Himika Akenaya) and Non Manaka/Triangle (Minami Tanaka). There are four versions of "Brand New Dreamer" which alternate after a certain number of episodes. "PriPara Dancing!!!" is later replaced by the ninth ending "Growin' Jewel!" by Iris. "Brand New Dreamer" is later replaced by the ninth opening "Shining Star" by Iris.

Episode list

Season 1 (2014-15)

Season 2 (2015-16)

Season 3 (2016-17)

References

PriPara
Pripara